Gyropena verans, also known as the sunken-spired pinwheel snail, is a species of air-breathing land snail, a terrestrial pulmonate gastropod mollusc in the pinwheel snail family, that is endemic to Australia's Lord Howe Island in the Tasman Sea.

Description
The shell of the snail is 1.3–1.5 mm in height, with a diameter of 2.7–2.9 mm. The colour is pale fawn with irregular brown flammulations (flame-like markings). The shape is discoidal with a sunken spire, shouldered whorls, impressed sutures, and with prominent, closely-spaced radial ribs. The umbilicus is widely open. The aperture is roundly lunate. The animal is unknown.

Distribution and habitat
This very rare snail occurs on the summits and slopes of Mount Lidgbird and Mount Gower, inhabiting plant litter.

References

 
 

 
verans
Gastropods of Lord Howe Island
Taxa named by Tom Iredale
Gastropods described in 1944